Bernd Thijs (born 28 June 1978 in Hasselt, Belgium) is a Belgian retired footballer who played as a midfielder. His former clubs include Borussia Mönchengladbach, Standard Liège, Genk, KAA Gent and Trabzonspor. Thijs played five times with Belgium and was in the team for the 2002 World Cup.

Thijs is well known because of his sober style, his ballhandling with both feet and his targeted long shots. He usually played as a defensive midfielder, but was also capable of playing one row further up front. Sometimes he was also posted (as an emergency solution) in defense. At Gent, he was the captain of the team.

Honours 
Standard Liège
Belgian Cup: runner-up 1998–1999, 1999–2000
UEFA Intertoto Cup: runner-up 1996

RC Genk
 Belgian First Division: 2001–02

K.A.A. Gent
Belgian Cup: 2009–10

Belgium
 FIFA Fair Play Trophy: 2002 World Cup

Individual
 Best Gent-Player of the Season: 2011–12

References

External links
 
 

1978 births
Living people
Sportspeople from Hasselt
Footballers from Limburg (Belgium)
Belgian footballers
Association football midfielders
Belgium international footballers
Belgian Pro League players
Süper Lig players
Bundesliga players
Standard Liège players
K.R.C. Genk players
Trabzonspor footballers
Borussia Mönchengladbach players
K.A.A. Gent players
2002 FIFA World Cup players
Belgian expatriate footballers
Belgian expatriate sportspeople in Turkey
Expatriate footballers in Turkey
Belgian expatriate sportspeople in Germany
Expatriate footballers in Germany